Izbiska  is a village in the administrative district of Gmina Stegna, within Nowy Dwór Gdański County, Pomeranian Voivodeship, in northern Poland.

Before 1793 the area was part of Polish Royal Prussia, in 1793-1919 Prussia and Germany, 1920-1939 the Free City of Danzig, 1939-45 Nazi Germany. For the history of the region, see History of Pomerania.
The village has a population of 133.

References

Izbiska